The Harris Warehouse is an historic storage facility on 61 Railroad Street in Woonsocket, Rhode Island.  The 3-1/2 story stone structure, built in 1855, by Edward Harris, a leading Woonsocket industrialist, rises abruptly from the street opposite the railroad tracks.  The building is distinctive for its rubble stone construction, and its curved facade, designed to match the layout of the railroad spur on which it is located.

The warehouse was listed on the National Register of Historic Places in 1976.

See also
National Register of Historic Places listings in Providence County, Rhode Island

References

Buildings and structures in Woonsocket, Rhode Island
Commercial buildings on the National Register of Historic Places in Rhode Island
Commercial buildings completed in 1855
Warehouses on the National Register of Historic Places
National Register of Historic Places in Providence County, Rhode Island